Aspartic acid (symbol Asp or D; the ionic form is known as aspartate), is an α-amino acid that is used in the biosynthesis of proteins. Like all other amino acids, it contains an amino group and a carboxylic acid. Its α-amino group is in the protonated –NH form under physiological conditions, while its α-carboxylic acid group is deprotonated −COO− under physiological conditions. Aspartic acid has an acidic side chain (CH2COOH) which reacts with other amino acids, enzymes and proteins in the body. Under physiological conditions (pH 7.4) in proteins the side chain usually occurs as the negatively charged aspartate form, −COO−. It is a non-essential amino acid in humans, meaning the body can synthesize it as needed. It is encoded by the codons GAU and GAC.

D-Aspartate is one of two D-amino acids commonly found in mammals.[3]

In proteins aspartate sidechains are often hydrogen bonded to form asx turns or asx motifs, which frequently occur at the N-termini of alpha helices.

The L-isomer of Asp is one of the 22 proteinogenic amino acids, i.e., the building blocks of proteins. Aspartic acid, like glutamic acid, is classified as an acidic amino acid, with a pKa of 3.9, however in a peptide this is highly dependent on the local environment, and could be as high as 14. Asp is pervasive in biosynthesis.

Discovery
Aspartic acid was first discovered in 1827 by Auguste-Arthur Plisson and Étienne Ossian Henry by hydrolysis of asparagine, which had been isolated from asparagus juice in 1806. Their original method used lead hydroxide, but various other acids or bases are now more commonly used instead.

Forms and nomenclature
There are two forms or enantiomers of aspartic acid. The name "aspartic acid" can refer to either enantiomer or a mixture of two. Of these two forms, only one, "L-aspartic acid", is directly incorporated into proteins. The biological roles of its counterpart, "D-aspartic acid" are more limited. Where enzymatic synthesis will produce one or the other, most chemical syntheses will produce both forms, "DL-aspartic acid", known as a racemic mixture.

Synthesis

Biosynthesis
In the human body, aspartate is most frequently synthesized through the transamination of oxaloacetate. The biosynthesis of aspartate is facilitated by an aminotransferase enzyme: the transfer of an amine group from another molecule such as alanine or glutamine yields aspartate and an alpha-keto acid.

Chemical synthesis 
Industrially, aspartate is produced by amination of fumarate catalyzed by L-aspartate ammonia-lyase.

Racemic aspartic acid can be synthesized from diethyl sodium phthalimidomalonate,
(C6H4(CO)2NC(CO2Et)2).

Metabolism
In plants and microorganisms, aspartate is the precursor to several amino acids, including four that are essential for humans: methionine, threonine, isoleucine, and lysine. The conversion of aspartate to these other amino acids begins with reduction of aspartate to its "semialdehyde", O2CCH(NH2)CH2CHO.  Asparagine is derived from aspartate via transamidation:
-O2CCH(NH2)CH2CO2-  +  GC(O)NH3+   O2CCH(NH2)CH2CONH3+  +  GC(O)O
(where GC(O)NH2 and GC(O)OH are glutamine and glutamic acid, respectively)

Other biochemical roles
Aspartate has many other biochemical roles. It is a metabolite in the urea cycle and participates in gluconeogenesis. It carries reducing equivalents in the malate-aspartate shuttle, which utilizes the ready interconversion of aspartate and oxaloacetate, which is the oxidized (dehydrogenated) derivative of malic acid. Aspartate donates one nitrogen atom in the biosynthesis of inosine, the precursor to the purine bases. In addition, aspartic acid acts as a hydrogen acceptor in a chain of ATP synthase. Dietary L-aspartic acid has been shown to act as an inhibitor of Beta-glucuronidase, which serves to regulate enterohepatic circulation of bilirubin and bile acids.

Interactive pathway map

Neurotransmitter
Aspartate (the conjugate base of aspartic acid) stimulates NMDA receptors, though not as strongly as the amino acid neurotransmitter L-glutamate does.

Applications & market 
The three largest market segments include the U.S., Western Europe, and China. Current applications include biodegradable polymers (polyaspartic acid), low calorie sweeteners (aspartame), scale and corrosion inhibitors, and resins.

Superabsorbent polymers
One area of aspartic acid market growth is biodegradable superabsorbent polymers (SAP), and hydrogels.  The superabsorbent polymers market is anticipated to grow at a compound annual growth rate of 5.5% from 2014 to 2019 to reach a value of $8.78Bn globally. Around 75% of superabsorbent polymers are used in disposable diapers and an additional 20% is used for adult incontinence and feminine hygiene products. Polyaspartic acid, the polymerization product of aspartic acid, is a biodegradable substitute to polyacrylate. The polyaspartate market comprises a small fraction (est. < 1%) of the total SAP market.

Additional uses

In addition to SAP, aspartic acid has applications in the $19Bn fertilizer industry, where polyaspartate improves water retention and nitrogen uptake; the $1.1Bn (2020) concrete floor coatings market, where polyaspartic is a low VOC, low energy alternative to traditional epoxy resins; and lastly the >$5Bn scale and corrosion inhibitors market.

Sources

Dietary sources
Aspartic acid is not an essential amino acid, which means that it can be synthesized from central metabolic pathway intermediates in humans, and does not need to be present in the diet. In eukaryotic cells, roughly 1 in 20 amino acids incorporated into a protein is an aspartic acid, and accordingly almost any source of dietary protein will include aspartic acid. Additionally, aspartic acid is found in:
 Dietary supplements, either as aspartic acid itself or salts (such as magnesium aspartate)
 The sweetener aspartame, which is made from an aspartic acid and phenylalanine

See also 
 Aspartate transaminase
 Polyaspartic acid
 Sodium polyaspartate, a synthetic polyamide

References

External links 
GMD MS Spectrum
 

Proteinogenic amino acids
Glucogenic amino acids
Acidic amino acids
Dicarboxylic acids
Excitatory amino acids
Urea cycle
NMDA receptor agonists